Andrea Icardi (born 14 June 1963) is an Italian professional football coach and a former player, who played as a midfielder.

Icardi played 6 seasons for A.C. Milan in the first half of the 1980s, when the club was yo-yoing between Serie A and Serie B. He then spent two seasons at Atalanta B.C., two at S.S. Lazio and three at Hellas Verona F.C. before relocating to Sydney, Australia where he played for Marconi Stallions FC.

After he retired, Icardi coached teams in Italy. Since 2007, he is back in Sydney where he is director of the Milan Soccer Academy Australia.

Honours
Milan
 Mitropa Cup winner: 1982.

References

External links
 

1963 births
Living people
Italian footballers
Italy youth international footballers
Italy under-21 international footballers
Serie A players
Serie B players
A.C. Milan players
Atalanta B.C. players
S.S. Lazio players
Hellas Verona F.C. players
Italian expatriate footballers
Expatriate soccer players in Australia
Italian expatriate sportspeople in Australia
Marconi Stallions FC players
Italian football managers
A.C. Voghera managers
A.S.D. HSL Derthona managers
Association football midfielders